Raoul Kopelman (born October 21, 1933) is a scientist, inventor, and is currently the Richard Smalley Distinguished University Professor of Chemistry, Physics, Applied Physics, Biophysics, Biomedical Engineering and Chemical Biology at the University of Michigan. Amongst other accomplishments, he is well known for developing the Hoshen-Kopelman algorithm. He was also amongst the first scientists pushing to establish the field of nanotechnology.

Birth, education, and early career

Kopelman was born in Vienna, Austria and on April 1, 1939, at the age of 5, he fled with his parents (Josef and Klara-Chaja) from Austria to Jerusalem during the Second World War.

Later, while living in Tel-Aviv and in the sixth grade, his science teacher loaned him a German booklet on chemical experiments. With several other friends he formed a chemistry club, where they performed numerous experiments. The club included Assa Lifshitz (who went on to become a professor at the Department of Physical Chemistry at the Hebrew University of Jerusalem) and Joshua Jortner (who went on to become a Professor at the School of Chemistry, Tel Aviv University in Tel-Aviv, Israel).

With a desire of helping society, he later attended the Israel Institute of Technology to earn his bachelor's degree in chemical engineering and his master's degree in chemistry. He took classes on quantum mechanics with David Bohm and group theory with David Fox.

Kopelman studied under Ralph Halford to earn his PhD in Chemistry at Columbia University. He also worked at Harvard as the first postdoctoral researcher of William Klemperer. After this, he worked as a lecturer in chemistry at the Israel Institute of Technology and a Senior Research Fellow at the California Institute of Technology with Wilse Robinson.

Educator and scientific researcher

In 1966, Kopelman accepted a professorship position in chemistry at the University of Michigan, where he has served for over 50 years.

As an educator, Kopelman has successfully trained many active scientists in the fields of chemistry, biomedical engineering, applied physics and others. Students of his have included Weihong Tan and Nobel laureates Eric Betzig, Roald Hoffman, Richard Smalley, and Arieh Warshel.

In his scientific work, he has authored over 600 publications, including scientific papers, patents, and books with nearly 30,000 citations. His publications have an h-index of over 80 (h-indexes of over 60 are considered to be "truly exceptional").

Kopelman's work spans many disciplines and collaborators. Some of his notable accomplishments include:

 Hoshen–Kopelman algorithm – "a simple and efficient algorithm for labeling clusters on a grid, where the grid is a regular network of cells, with the cells being either occupied or unoccupied"

 Pioneering nanotechnology – Kopelman was publishing so early in the field that journals forced him to remove "nano" from articles as it was not yet an accepted term (e.g. Nano-optics)
 Using pulled fiber optics for near-field optics (including published work with Eric Betzig) and for intracellular measurements
 Light sources smaller than the optical wavelength
 Multiple discoveries in nanosensors and nanomedicine
 Discovery of the largest ever electric fields in cells

Awards

Kopelman's awards include

 Etter Memorial Lecture in Materials Chemistry, University of Minnesota
 Pittsburgh Analytical Chemistry Award, 2011
 Richard Smalley Distinguished University Professorship of Chemistry, Physics and Applied Physics, 2006
 ACS Division of Analytical Chemistry Award in Spectrochemical Analysis, 2005
 American Chemical Society Morley Award, 1997
 American Physical Society Lady Davis Fellowship
 Fellow of the American Association for the Advancement of Science
 Guggenheim Fellow, 1995
 J. William Fulbright Research Award
 National Institutes of Health National Research Service Award
 National Science Foundation Creativity Award
 Collegiate Inventors Grand Prize (together with Ph.D student, Jeffrey Anker), 2002

Personal life

Kopelman married his late wife Chava Blodek on September 15, 1955. Together they have three children Orion, Leeron, and Shirli.

References

1933 births
Living people
University of Michigan faculty
Columbia Graduate School of Arts and Sciences alumni
American chemists
American nanotechnologists
Technion – Israel Institute of Technology alumni
Fellows of the American Physical Society